Tsang Kin-Wah is a visual artist based in Hong Kong. His earlier work, particularly his "wallpaper art", was known for its combination of beautiful illustration and painting, and for its use of profane or obscene words. More recently, he has explored topics related to politics and religion via large-form, multi-media installations that combine music, video and light projections.

Early life and education  
Tsang was born in Shantou, Guangdong Province, China, and moved to Hong Kong as a young child. He studied art at the Chinese University of Hong Kong and the Camberwell College of Arts in London on a Chevening Scholarship.

Wallpaper Art 

His wallpaper art creates large-scale wallpaper installations that evoke the floral designs of William Morris in a style that has become known as word-art installation. 
It combines foul language with floral patterns (the text is arranged to form flowers and plants), highlighting the organic force intertwining nature and human; the surface being the text and
the attached emotions as shouts to be discovered by the visitor.

Multimedia installations 
Kin-Wah Tsang's most recent work explores topics in philosophy, religion, and popular culture through immersive multimedia installations. One of the first such installations was "Ecce Homo Trilogy”.  The installation's idea is centered upon "Ecce Homo", a phrase that was both used by Pontius Pilate at the last judgment and as the title of a book by Nietzsche.  By placing these two references together, Tsang questions the impartialness of judgment.

The next major installation was "The Infinite Nothing,” a phrase also coming from Nietzsche.  The installation consists of separate video installations that represent transformative journeys through stages in life.  Following up on this work, his latest work "Nothing" continues to explore the idea of existence.   It is the first commissioned exhibit of the $3 billion West Kowloon Cultural District.

Prizes and commissions 
 In 2005, at the age of 29, Tsang won the US $25,000 Sovereign Art Foundation Prize.
 In 2012, he was the first Hong Kong artist chosen to create a large installation for the new Hong Kong gallery of Pearl Lam.
 In 2014, he was chosen to represent Hong Kong at the 2015 Venice Biennale.
 In 2016, the Hong Kong government chose him again, to create the first solo show for the West Kowloon Cultural District. 
 In 2016, Tsang is part of a major group show of Chinese artists at the Guggenheim museum in New York. For example, see .

Museum and other collections 
 A3 Collection, Kadist Art Foundation, USA
 Burger Collection, Zurich, Switzerland 
 Camberwell College of Arts, the London Institute, London
 CODA Museum, Apeldoorn, The Netherlands
 Deutsche Bank Collection, Hong Kong
 DSL Collection, Paris
 Guggenheim Museum, New York
 Mori Art Museum, Tokyo
 Museum of Design Zurich, Switzerland 
 Hong Kong Heritage Museum, Hong Kong
 Hong Kong Museum of Art, Hong Kong
 M+ Pavilion, Hong Kong
 New Asia College, The Chinese University of Hong Kong
 Sovereign Art Foundation, Hong Kong
 The Sigg Collection, Switzerland 
 Thomas Shao Collection, Shanghai
 William Lim's Living Collection, Hong Kong

References 

21st-century Chinese artists
Hong Kong artists
People from Shantou
Alumni of the Chinese University of Hong Kong
Alumni of the University of the Arts London